Misión: La Cima is a rap album released by Puerto Rican singer Vico C. The songs "Me acuerdo", "Viernes 13 (Parte 2), "She likes my reggae"  and "Tony Presidio" are considered standouts. This last track appeared in "Aquel Que Había Muerto" under the guise of being a new version, and was more popular than the original.

Track listing
All songs written by Vico C.
 Misión: La Cima 4:08
 Mundo Artificial 4:58
 Me Acuerdo 5:55
 She Likes My Reggae 4:26
 El Filósofo 4:33
 Viernes 13 (Parte 2) 5:50
 Tony Presidio 4:04

References 

1990 albums
Vico C albums